The following outline is provided as an overview of and topical guide to atheism:

Atheism – rejection of belief in the existence of deities. In a narrower sense, atheism is specifically the position that there are no deities. Most inclusively, atheism is simply the absence of belief that any deities exist.
Atheism is contrasted with theism,
which in its most general form is the belief that at least one deity exists.

Descriptions of atheism 
Atheism can be described as all of the following:

 a philosophy –
 a belief –
 a non-belief –
 a stance – taking a position in an argument, a stand on a given issue

Types of atheism 
 Positive atheism – the form of atheism that asserts there is no deity. Also called "strong atheism".
 Explicit atheism – "the absence of theistic belief due to a conscious rejection of it".
 Negative atheism – refers to any type of non-theism other than positive atheism, wherein a person does not believe in the existence of any deity, but without asserting there to be none. Also called "weak atheism".
 Implicit atheism – "the absence of theistic belief without a conscious rejection of it".
 Agnostic atheism – philosophical position that encompasses both atheism and agnosticism. Agnostic atheists are atheistic because they do not hold a belief in the existence of any deity and agnostic because they claim that the existence of a deity is either unknowable in principle or currently unknown in fact.

Atheistic arguments 
 Arguments against God's existence –
 Argument from free will – contends that omniscience and free will are incompatible, and that any conception of God that incorporates both properties is therefore inherently contradictory. Also called the "paradox of free will", and "theological fatalism".
 Argument from Human Fallibility –The human mind is fallible, and therefore it is unlikely that our understanding of God is accurate.
 Argument from Scientific Explanations – The natural world can be explained through scientific means and does not require the intervention of a supernatural being. This argument suggests that the natural world can be explained through scientific means and that there is no need to invoke the existence of a supernatural being. For example, the idea that God created the universe is not necessary, given the scientific explanation of the Big Bang theory.
 Argument from inconsistent revelations – asserts that it is unlikely that God exists because many theologians and faithful adherents have produced conflicting and mutually exclusive revelations. The argument states that since a person not privy to revelation must either accept it or reject it based solely upon the authority of its proponents, and since there is no way for a mere mortal to resolve these conflicting claims by investigation, it is prudent to reserve one's judgment. Also known as the "avoiding the wrong hell problem".
 Argument from nonbelief – premise that if God existed (and wanted humanity to know it), he would have brought about a situation in which every reasonable person believed in him; however, there are reasonable unbelievers, and therefore, this weighs against God's existence. The argument affirms inconsistency between the world that exists and the world that should exist if God had certain desires combined with the power to see them through.
 Argument from Religious Diversity – The conflicting claims of different religions about the nature of God and the afterlife make it unlikely that any one of them is true. This argument suggests that the conflicting claims of different religions make it unlikely that any one of them is true. For example, the idea that there is only one God is incompatible with the idea that there are many gods.
 Argument from poor design – reasons that an omnipotent, omniscient, omnibenevolent creator God would create organisms that have optimal design. Organisms have features that are sub-optimal. Therefore, God either did not create these organisms or is not omnipotent, omniscient, and omnibenevolent. Also called the "dysteleological argument".
 Argument from Lack of Evidence – There is no conclusive evidence for the existence of God and therefore it is reasonable to conclude that God does not exist. This argument suggests that there is no conclusive evidence for the existence of God, and therefore it is reasonable to conclude that God does not exist.
 Incompatible-properties argument – argument that the existence of evil is incompatible with the concept of an omnipotent and perfectly good God. A "good" God is incompatible with some possible worlds, thus incapable of creating them without losing the property of being a totally good God. A "good" God can create only "good" worlds.
 Omnipotence paradox – states that: if a being can perform any action, then it should be able to create a task which this being is unable to perform; hence, this being cannot perform all actions. Yet, on the other hand, if this being cannot create a task that it is unable to perform, then there exists something it cannot do.
 Problem of evil – question of how to explain evil if there exists a deity that is omnibenevolent, omnipotent, and omniscient. Some philosophers have claimed that the existences of such a god and of evil are logically incompatible or unlikely.
 Argument from Personal Experience – One's own personal experiences and observations do not provide any evidence for the existence of God. This argument suggests that personal experiences and observations do not provide any evidence for the existence of God. For example, a person's own experience of the natural world does not provide any evidence for the existence of God, as natural phenomena can be explained through scientific means.

 Fate of the unlearned – eschatological question about the ultimate destiny of people who have not been exposed to a particular theology or doctrine and thus have no opportunity to embrace it. The question is whether those who never hear of requirements issued through divine revelations will be punished for failure to abide by those requirements.
 Problem of Hell – ethical problem related to religions in which portrayals of Hell are ostensibly cruel, and are thus inconsistent with the concepts of a just, moral and omnibenevolent God.
 Atheist's Wager – goes something like this: "You should live your life and try to make the world a better place for your being in it, whether or not you believe in god. If there is no god, you have lost nothing and will be remembered fondly by those you left behind. If there is a benevolent god, he will judge you on your merits and not just on whether or not you believed in him."
 Russell's teapot – analogy first coined by the philosopher Bertrand Russell (1872–1970) to illustrate the idea that the philosophic burden of proof lies upon a person making scientifically unfalsifiable claims rather than shifting the burden of proof to others, specifically in the case of religion. Russell wrote that if he claimed that a teapot were orbiting the Sun somewhere in space between the Earth and Mars, it would be nonsensical for him to expect others not to doubt him on the grounds that they could not prove him wrong. Sometimes called the "celestial teapot" or "cosmic teapot".
 Theological noncognitivism – argument that religious language, and specifically words like "god", are not cognitively meaningful. Theological noncognitivists await a coherent definition of the word God (or of any other metaphysical utterance purported to be discussable) before being able to engage in arguments for or against God's existence.
 Ultimate Boeing 747 gambit – counter-argument to the modern form of the argument from design, by Richard Dawkins. A central thesis of the argument is that, compared to supernatural abiogenesis, evolution by natural selection requires the supposition of fewer hypothetical processes and thus, according to Occam's razor, a better explanation than the God hypothesis.

History of atheism 
 History of atheism
 New Atheism
 State atheism

General atheism concepts 
 Antitheism
 Atheism and religion
 Criticism of atheism
 Demographics of atheism
 Discrimination against atheists

Related positions 
 Agnosticism
 Agnostic theism
 Agnostic atheism
 Ignosticism
 Apatheism
 Weak agnosticism
 Strong agnosticism
 List of agnostics
 Anti-clericalism
 Antireligion
 Criticism of religion
 Freethought
 Freedom From Religion Foundation
 Irreligion
 Naturalism
 Humanistic naturalism
 Metaphysical naturalism
 Methodological naturalism
 Religious naturalism
 Parody religion
 Post-theism
 Secularism
 Secularity
 Secular humanism
 Secularist organizations

Atheism organizations 

List of atheist organizations

Atheism publications 
 The Encyclopedia of Unbelief
 The New Encyclopedia of Unbelief

Persons influential in atheism 

 Diagoras of Melos (fifth century BCE)
 Theodorus the Atheist (c. 340 – c. 250 BCE)
 Ibn al-Rawandi (827 – 911 CE)
 Baron d'Holbach (1723 – 1789)
 Bertrand Russell (1872 – 1970)
 Periyar E. V. Ramasamy (17 September 1879 – 24 December 1973)
 Goparaju Ramachandra Rao (15 November 1902 – 26 July 1975)
 Isaac Asimov (2 January 1920 – 6 April 1992)
 Jordan Howard Sobel (22 September 1929 – 26 March 2010)
 Christopher Hitchens (13 April 1949 – 15 December 2011)
 Stephen Hawking (8 January 1942 – 14 March 2018)
 Richard Dawkins
 Daniel Dennett
 Sam Harris
 Lawrence Krauss
 Michael Shermer
 Matt Dillahunty

See also

References

External links 

Atheism
Atheism